The Ship is the twenty-seventh solo studio album by English musician Brian Eno, released on 29 April 2016 on Warp Records. It was announced on Eno's website on 24 February 2016. The album is Eno's first solo album to contain vocals since 2005's Another Day on Earth. The Ship debuted at number 28 on the UK Albums Chart and is the second highest-charting solo album of Eno's solo career (after debut Here Come The Warm Jets.) The album received critical acclaim.

Background
Brian Eno has said the title is a reference to the sinking of Titanic, which he has called "the apex of human technical power, set to be man's greatest triumph over nature". The album was originally conceived as a multi-channel sound installation, when Eno discovered that he could sing in a low C: "As you get older, you know, your voice drops, so you sort of gain a semi-tone at the bottom and lose about six at the top every year. That's what's happened to me. So I've suddenly got this new, low voice I can sing with, and I just started singing with that piece. And, so it was the first time I thought, "Oh, what about making a song that you could walk around inside?".

Accolades

Track listing

 "Fickle Sun (III) I'm Set Free" is a cover of the Velvet Underground's "I'm Set Free", from their third studio album The Velvet Underground.

Personnel
Credits are adapted from The Ship liner notes.

Brian Eno – producer, recording
Peter Chilvers – co-producer, recording, programming, keyboards, vocoder
Leo Abrahams – guitar 
Jon Hopkins – keyboards 
Nell Catchpole – violin, viola 
Nuria Homs – voice 
Members of the Elgin Marvels – voice  
Peter Serafinowicz – voice

Charts

See also

2016 in music
Installation art

References

2016 albums
Brian Eno albums
Albums produced by Brian Eno
Warp (record label) albums
Albums produced by Peter Chilvers (musician)